Kong Ming or Kongming may refer to:

Zhuge Liang, a Three Kingdoms strategist whose Chinese style name is Kongming
Kong Ming (Water Margin), a fictional character in the Water Margin